III is the third studio album by Finnish pop rock band Haloo Helsinki!. It was released by EMI Finland digitally on 25 February 2011.

Track listing

Charts and certifications

Weekly charts

Year-end charts

Certifications

References

2011 albums
Haloo Helsinki! albums
EMI Records albums
Finnish-language albums